Lincoln University of Business and Management (LUBM) is a private institution based in Sharjah,  United Arab Emirates, with campuses in Sharjah and Fujairah. LUBM offers management programs in bachelor, master and diploma levels in association with international institutions.

History
Lincoln University of Business and Management is an organization imparting business and management education to working adults in the Middle East and beyond. The institute was established in 2014 and has trained approximately 1,000 students in the region.

References

External links
 

Companies based in the Emirate of Sharjah
Business schools in the United Arab Emirates
2014 establishments in the United Arab Emirates
Educational institutions established in 2014